Randell Adjei is a Canadian poet who was named in April 2021 as the first Poet Laureate of Ontario.

Primarily a spoken word poet, Adjei published his debut book I Am Not My Struggles in 2018. He is also the founder and creative director of R.I.S.E. (Reaching Intelligent Souls Everywhere), an arts organization and talent incubator for young writers and musicians of colour in the Toronto area.

Adjei was born in Ghana and raised in Scarborough, Ontario.

Adjei performed a spoken word piece on the 2021 FreeUp! The Emancipation Day Special.

References

External links

21st-century Canadian poets
21st-century Canadian male writers
Canadian male poets
Canadian spoken word poets
Black Canadian writers
Writers from Scarborough, Toronto
Poets Laureate of places in Canada
Canadian people of Ghanaian descent